A Second Message to America is an undated beheading video, depicting the death of Steven Sotloff, published by the Islamic State (ISIL, ISIS, IS) media department Al-Furqan Media Productions.

Synopsis
On September 2, 2014, the SITE Intelligence Group discovered the video of Sotloff's execution on what they called "a file-sharing site" and released it to their subscribers.

The video opens with a news clip of a press conference of an August 20 speech by American president Barack Obama denouncing ISIL for the beheading of journalist James Foley followed by a title screen. The video then shows Sotloff, wearing an orange jumpsuit kneeling with his hands behind his back and a wireless microphone in a desert background. To his right is a figure dressed head-to-toe in black, holding a knife in his left hand and wearing a pistol in a holster, who was later identified as Mohammed Emwazi, the same person that killed James Foley. Then Sotloff delivers a prepared statement: 

Next the executioner says while waving the knife at the camera: 

The executioner then puts his right hand on Sotloff's chin and the knife to his throat and begins a sawing motion while Sotloff flinches then falls back. The video fades to black without showing any blood. Next the camera pans left to right as it shows Sotloff's body on the ground with his bloody head on top of headless body. Jeff Smith, Associate Director of the CU Denver National Center for Media Forensics, opines that while the body shown in the later frames of the video is real, the footage of the beheading itself is likely staged. Smith further remarks that the video was of a high production value, and was likely overseen by a director, shot with multiple cameras, and skillfully edited with modern equipment.

In the scene following Steven's execution, the same executioner is shown holding another prisoner, British aid worker David Cawthorne Haines, and saying "We take this opportunity to warn those governments that enter this evil alliance of America against the Islamic State to back off and leave our people alone."

See also 

 2014 American intervention in Iraq
 2014 ISIL beheading incidents
 Beheading in Islamism
 Foreign hostages in Iraq
 James Foley (journalist)
 Steven Sotloff

Notes

References 

Propaganda films
Beheading videos
Islamic State of Iraq and the Levant mass media